Hulme is an inner city area and electoral ward of Manchester, England

Hulme may also refer to:

Places
Hulme, Cheshire, a U.K. location
Hulme, Staffordshire, England
Hulme, Trafford, a U.K. location

Other uses
 Hulme (surname), a family name (including a list of persons with the name)
 James Hulme Canfield (1847–1909), fourth President of the Ohio State University
 William Hulme Hooper (19th century), Royal Navy officer
 Hulme Supercars Ltd., a New Zealand supercar manufacturer

See also
 Hulme Hall (disambiguation)
 
 Hume (disambiguation)